Conognatha is a genus of beetles in the family Buprestidae, tribe Stigmoderini, containing the following species: They are found in the Neotropical realm.

 Conognatha abdominalis Waterhouse, 1912
 Conognatha acuminata Thomson, 1878
 Conognatha amoena (Kirby, 1818)
 Conognatha apicalis Waterhouse, 1912
 Conognatha auricollis (Mannerheim, 1837)
 Conognatha azarae (Philippi & Philippi, 1860)
 Conognatha azurea (Philippi, 1859)
 Conognatha badenii Saunders, 1872
 Conognatha batesii Saunders, 1869
 Conognatha bifasciata Waterhouse, 1882
 Conognatha brevicollis (Kirsch, 1866)
 Conognatha buqueti (Gory & Laporte, 1838)
 Conognatha callioma Théry, 1932
 Conognatha carlosvidali Moore, 2008
 Conognatha celineae Moore & Lander, 2010
 Conognatha chabrillaci Thomson, 1878
 Conognatha chalybaeofasciata (Germain & Kerremans, 1906)
 Conognatha chalybeiventris (Fairmaire & Germain, 1858)
 Conognatha chiliensis (Guérin-Méneville, 1830)
 Conognatha clara Erichson, 1848
 Conognatha coeruleipennis (Obenberger, 1922)
 Conognatha compta (Perty, 1830)
 Conognatha costipennis (Germain, 1856)
 Conognatha elegantissima (Obenberger, 1922)
 Conognatha elongata (Kerremans, 1903)
 Conognatha errata (Fairmaire, 1867)
 Conognatha excellens (Klug, 1825)
 Conognatha eximia Saunders, 1869
 Conognatha fasciata (Gory & Laporte, 1838)
 Conognatha germaini Théry in Hoscheck, 1934
 Conognatha gounellei (Kerremans, 1903)
 Conognatha haemorrhoidalis (Olivier, 1790)
 Conognatha hamatifera (Gory, 1841)
 Conognatha hauseri Obenberger, 1928
 Conognatha humeralis (Philippi, 1859)
 Conognatha impressipennis Saunders, 1871
 Conognatha inornata Rothkirch, 1912
 Conognatha insignis (Perty, 1830)
 Conognatha interrupta Waterhouse, 1882
 Conognatha iris (Olivier, 1790)
 Conognatha juno (Gory & Laporte, 1838)
 Conognatha klugii (Gory, 1841)
 Conognatha laticollis (Philippi) in Philippi & Philippi, 1864)
 Conognatha leachi Waterhouse, 1912
 Conognatha lebasii (Mannerheim, 1837)
 Conognatha leechi Cobos, 1959
 Conognatha lesnei Hoscheck, 1934
 Conognatha macleayi (Donovan, 1825)
 Conognatha magellanica (Fairmaire, 1883)
 Conognatha magnifica (Gory & Laporte, 1838)
 Conognatha mayeti Théry, 1904
 Conognatha minor Saunders, 1869
 Conognatha minutissima Hoscheck, 1934
 Conognatha obenbergeri Olave, 1939
 Conognatha octoguttata Waterhouse, 1882
 Conognatha olivacea Saunders, 1869
 Conognatha ovatula Hoscheck, 1931
 Conognatha pallidipennis Théry, 1931
 Conognatha parallela Saunders, 1869
 Conognatha parallelogramma (Perty, 1830)
 Conognatha paranaensis Saunders, 1872
 Conognatha patricia (Klug, 1825)
 Conognatha penai Moore, 1981
 Conognatha percheroni (Guérin-Méneville, 1831)
 Conognatha posticalis Saunders, 1869
 Conognatha pretiosissima Chevrolat, 1838
 Conognatha principalis (Gory & Laporte, 1838)
 Conognatha reichardti Cobos, 1967
 Conognatha rochereaui Théry, 1932
 Conognatha rogersii Saunders, 1872
 Conognatha rufipes Saunders, 1869
 Conognatha rufiventris Waterhouse, 1912
 Conognatha sanguinipennis Mannerheim, 1837
 Conognatha sellovii (Klug, 1825)
 Conognatha semenovi Obenberger, 1928
 Conognatha soropega Gistel, 1857
 Conognatha souverbii (Germain, 1856)
 Conognatha splendens Waterhouse, 1912
 Conognatha subdilatata Saunders, 1869
 Conognatha surinamensis Moore & Lander, 2010
 Conognatha theryi Obenberger, 1934
 Conognatha thoreyi (Chevrolat, 1838)
 Conognatha tomyris Gistel, 1857
 Conognatha viridiventris (Solier, 1849)

References

Buprestidae genera